The 2017 Men's Hockey Asia Cup, also known as the Hero Men's Asia Cup 2017 due to sponsorship reasons, was the tenth edition of the Men's Hockey Asia Cup. It was held from 11 to 22 October 2017 in Dhaka, Bangladesh. The winner of this tournament qualified for the 2018 World Cup in India.

India won their third title after defeating Malaysia 2–1 in the final, while Pakistan captured the bronze medal beating South Korea 6–3.

Qualified teams
Sri Lanka withdrew and were replaced by China.

Results
All times are local (UTC+6).

Preliminary round

Pool A

Pool B

Fifth to eighth place classification

5–8th place semi-finals

Seventh place game

Fifth place game

First to fourth place classification

Super 4s

Third place game

Final

Statistics

Final standings

 Qualified for the 2018 World Cup as hosts

Goalscorers

See also
2017 Women's Hockey Asia Cup

References

Hockey Asia Cup
Asia Cup
Hockey Asia Cup
Sport in Dhaka
International field hockey competitions hosted by Bangladesh
Hockey Asia Cup
2010s in Dhaka
Asia Cup